Darley Abbey is a former village, and later a suburb, to the north of the city of Derby, England.  It contains 25 listed buildings that are recorded in the National Heritage List for England.   Of these, one is listed at Grade I, the highest of the three grades, four are at Grade II*, the middle grade, and the others are at Grade II, the lowest grade.  The village contained an abbey, but little of it remains, apart from the building converted for use as the Abbey Inn.  Industry came to the village in the 15th century, and this was further developed from 1782 by the Evans family, who built mills, and housing and community facilities for their workers.  The mills, later used for other purposes, and many of the workers' houses are listed, together with a church and other community facilities.


Key

Buildings

References

Citations

Sources

 

Lists of listed buildings in Derbyshire